Lick Hollow is a valley in Ste. Genevieve County in the U.S. state of Missouri.

Lick Hollow was so named on account of mineral licks in the valley.

References

Valleys of Ste. Genevieve County, Missouri
Valleys of Missouri